Mohile is a surname. Notable people with the surname include:

 Amar Mohile, Indian film score composer
 Anil Mohile (1940–2012), Indian music composer and music arranger
 Supriya Gupta Mohile, American geriatric oncologist

 Supath Mohile, Lecturer at Sardar Patel Institute of Public Administration (SPIPA)

Indian surnames